Carneros Creek is a westward flowing stream and is the primary source of freshwater flowing into Elkhorn Slough. Its source is in the northern Gabilan Range along Highway 101/156. After it waters transit Elkhorn Slough, the historic mouth of the Salinas River, Carneros Creek empties into Monterey Bay at Moss Landing, California.

History
Mexican land grants named Los Carneros, which is Spanish for "sheep", date to 1834, 1839 and 1842 in Monterey County. Just east of Elkhorn Slough was Rancho Los Carneros (Littlejohn), but east of Highway 156/101 was Rancho Los Carneros (McDougall).

Watershed
The creek contributes an average of 2,800 acre feet to Elkhorn Slough annually. Because this creek previously contained the flow of the Pajaro River (whose present day watershed is just to the north) the creek bed is very coarse sand. Carneros Creek ran dry from June until December during the 2000 water year. Because the flow in the creek drops to zero over the summer months, seawater from Elkhorn Slough can flow back into the creek bed during high tides.

The source of the mainstem is at  elevation just north of Echo Valley Road and west of Highway 156/101, from whence it flows north along the highway for 2.6 km where it is met by an eastern fork which begins further east in the Gabilan Range in San Benito County. The eastern fork flows westward along Rocks Road east of, then around the north flank of, Pinacate Peak until it crosses back into Monterey County and under Highway 156/101, joining the Carneros Creek mainstem in the Cañada de la Carpinteria. From its confluence with the eastern fork, the mainstem Carneros Creek flows westward along San Juan Road, Tarpy Road, then Hall Road before joining Elkhorn Slough at the southern boundary of the historic Mexican land grant Rancho Bolsa de San Cayetano, near Las Lomas.

The majority of the creek has been channelized in order to maximize the amount of land available for agriculture and cattle grazing. The channel walls have been reinforced with dredge spoil levees to provide some level of flood protection for the surrounding property. However, there is evidence that Carneros Creek was once a meandering stream with connected floodplains, oxbow ponds, and wetlands that would have supported riparian habitat and amphibian populations.

Ecology
Agricultural and Land-based Training Association (ALBA) and through a 4-year USEPA grant, the Coastal Watershed Council (CWC) is monitoring the impacts of organic farming practices and wetland restoration on water quality in Carneros Creek at ALBA’s Triple M Ranch in North Monterey County. Significant wetlands border Carneros Creek, although these have been greatly reduced by artificial levees in order to grow crops on the many small tenant farms along the creek. Wetland restoration has the potential for creating habitat for the Santa Cruz Long-toed salamander (Ambystoma macrodactylum croceum) and California red-legged frog (Rana draytonii).

See also
 Elkhorn Slough
 Elkhorn Slough National Estuarine Research Reserve
 List of rivers in California

References

External links
The official website of the Elkhorn Slough Foundation and Elkhorn Slough National Estuarine Research Reserve

Rivers of Monterey County, California
Drainage basins of Monterey Bay
Rivers of Northern California